Bharatiya Vidya Bhavan  is an Indian educational trust. It was founded on 7 November 1938 by Dr K.M  Munshi, with the support of Mahatma Gandhi. The trust programmes through its 119 centres in India, 7 centres abroad and 367 constituent institutions, cover "all aspects of life from the cradle to the grave and beyond – it fills a growing vacuum in modern life", as Pandit Jawaharlal Nehru observed when he first visited the Bharatiya Vidya Bhavan in 1950.

Organisation
The trust operates a number of primary and secondary institutes in India and abroad. It organizes and runs 100 private schools in India. The schools are known as Bharatiya Vidya Mandir, Bhavan's Vidya Mandir, or Bhavan's Vidyalaya.

The Bhavan significantly grew as a cultural organization and became a global foundation under the leadership of Sundaram Ramakrishnan who took over as the director after the death of Munshi in 1971. The first foreign centre was opened in London in 1972.

Constitution
Bharatiya Vidya Bhavan's motto is "Let noble thoughts come to us from every side", a quote from the Rigveda. The constitution of the Bhavan lays down the qualities that everyone connected with the Bhavan should develop for the Bhavan's consolidation and sustained growth. They are:

 An understanding of the aims of the Bhavan and a sense of identification with them, expressed in continuous efforts to realise them in every field of activity.
 A spirit of dedication to the Bhavan which will prompt everyone to ask, not "what can I get from the Bhavan?" but "what can I do for the Bhavan?"
 A faith in the culture of our land, particularly in the Epics and in the teachings of the Bhagavad Gita.
 The habit of daily prayer, in private and in congregation and the practice of invoking the grace of God before any work is begun and to so do it that it is fit to be offered to Him.
 A passion for the Sanskrit language, to study it oneself and to popularize it among others.
 The development of a healthy mind that is neither petrified by custom nor capering at the call of every fancy, but which is rooted in the past, draws sustenance from the ennobling elements in the present and strives for a more radiant future.

Board members
The current President of the Bhavan is Surendralal Mehta, and the Vice-President is Bellur Srikrishna.

Some of the honorary members on the Board (past and present) include the Dalai Lama, King Charles, Jawaharlal Nehru, Sardar Vallabhbhai Patel, JRD Tata and Mother Teresa, among others.

See also
 Universities and colleges affiliated with the Bharatiya Vidya Bhavan

References

External links 

 
 Amrita Bharati website
 PM Manmohan Singh's remarks on visit to Bharatiya Vidya Bhavan in 2006
 Bill Gates makes personal donation to Bharatiya Vidya Bhavan's computer initiative
 Bharatiya Vidya Bhavan to start scholarship scheme for students
 Visit London: The Bhavan Centre – Institute Of Indian Arts and Culture
 BVBPS BHEL Ramachandrapuram's Official Website
 Bharatiya Vidya Bhavan's Book University

 
Educational organisations based in India
Private schools in Kochi
Private schools in Thiruvananthapuram
Recipients of the Gandhi Peace Prize
Universities and colleges affiliated with the Bharatiya Vidya Bhavan
Sanskrit revival
1938 establishments in India